The 2025 U Sports Women's Ice Hockey Championship is scheduled to be held in March 2025, in Elmira, Ontario, to determine a national champion for the 2024–25 U Sports women's ice hockey season. The tournament will be hosted by the Waterloo Warriors.

Host
The tournament is scheduled to be played at Woolwich Memorial Centre in Elmira, Ontario. This is scheduled to be the first time that the University of Waterloo will host the tournament.

Scheduled teams
Canada West Representative
OUA Representative
RSEQ Representative
AUS Representative
Host (Waterloo Warriors)
Three additional berths

References

External links 
 Tournament Web Site

U Sports women's ice hockey
Ice hockey competitions in Ontario
2024–25 in Canadian ice hockey
2025 in Ontario